D.300 is a major east–west state road spanning  through central Turkey. The route begins in Çeşme, Izmir and runs east to Kapıköy, Van, on the Turkey-Iran border. The route connects several provincial capitals, including Izmir, Uşak, Afyon, Konya, Aksaray, Kayseri, Malatya, Elazığ, Muş and Van. The route is the second longest state highway in Turkey, after the D.400.

The D300 is a four-lane highway for most of the route, except for two short sections toward the western end, and even becomes a controlled-access highway within Izmir.

Main intersections

Itinerary

See also
 Kömürhan Bridge

References and notes 

300
Transport in İzmir Province
Transport in Manisa Province
Transport in Uşak Province
Transport in Afyonkarahisar Province
Transport in Konya Province
Transport in Aksaray Province
Transport in Nevşehir Province
Transport in Kayseri Province
Transport in Sivas Province
Transport in Malatya Province
Transport in Elazığ Province
Transport in Bingöl Province
Transport in Muş Province
Transport in Bitlis Province
Transport in Van Province